The Russo-Ottoman alliance was a defensive alliance between the Russian Empire and the Ottoman Empire, directed against France between 1799 and 1806, during the Napoleonic Wars.

This was complemented by the Anglo-Ottoman alliance formed later that month.

French victory over Russia in the War of the Third Coalition caused a shift in Ottoman policy away from Russia and towards France. Selim III refused to ratify the treaty signed in September 1805. By February 1806, Russian warships were being blocked from the Turkish Straits. In October, Russia invaded the Ottoman Empire and in December the Ottomans formally declared war. The Russo-Ottoman war lasted until 1812. In March 1812, Russia demanded an alliance as part of the treaty to end the war. This was rejected by the Ottomans, who preferred neutrality. It did not find its way into the Treaty of Bucharest that formally ended the Russo-Ottoman war in May.

See also
Siege of Corfu (1798–1799)
French campaign in Egypt and Syria
Mediterranean campaign of 1798
War of the Second Coalition

Footnotes

Bibliography 

Treaties of the Russian Empire
Treaties of the Ottoman Empire
Ottoman Empire–Russian Empire relations
1799 establishments in Europe
1799 establishments in Asia
1806 disestablishments in Europe
Napoleonic Wars treaties